John Howard Northrop (July 5, 1891 – May 27, 1987) was an American biochemist who, with James Batcheller Sumner and Wendell Meredith Stanley, won the 1946 Nobel Prize in Chemistry.  The award was given for these scientists' isolation, crystallization, and study of enzymes, proteins, and viruses. Northrop was a Professor of Bacteriology and Medical Physics, Emeritus, at University of California, Berkeley.

Biography

Early years
Northrop was born in Yonkers, New York to John Isaiah, a zoologist and instructor at Columbia University who is a member of the Havemeyer family, and Alice Rich Northrop, a teacher of botany at Hunter College. His father died in a lab explosion two weeks before John H. Northrop was born. The son was educated at Yonkers High School and Columbia University, where he earned his BA in 1912 and PhD in chemistry in 1915. During World War I, he conducted research for the U.S. Chemical Warfare Service on the production of acetone and ethanol through fermentation. This work led to studying enzymes.

Research
In 1929, Northrop isolated and crystallized the gastric enzyme pepsin and determined that it was a protein. In 1938 he isolated and crystallized the first bacteriophage (a small virus that attacks bacteria), and determined that it was a nucleoprotein. Northrop also isolated and crystallized pepsinogen (the precursor to pepsin), trypsin, chymotrypsin, and carboxypeptidase.

For his 1939 book, Crystalline Enzymes: The Chemistry of Pepsin, Trypsin, and Bacteriophage, Northrop was awarded the Daniel Giraud Elliot Medal from the National Academy of Sciences. He was elected a Fellow of the American Academy of Arts and Sciences in 1949. Northrop was employed by the Rockefeller Institute for Medical Research in New York City from 1916 until his retirement in 1961. In 1949 he joined the University of California, Berkeley as Professor of Bacteriology, and later, he was appointed Professor of Biophysics.

Personal life

In 1917, Northrop married Louise Walker (1891–1975), with whom he had two children: John, an oceanographer, and Alice, who married Nobel laureate Frederick C. Robbins. The family lived in a small home just outside of Mt. Vernon, New York. As their children grew older and Northrop looked for a more desirable workplace, the family bought a home in Cotuit, Massachusetts. This move shortened Northrop's commute to the laboratory in Princeton, New Jersey, and also put him in closer contact with the wilderness which he greatly enjoyed. Northrop committed suicide in Wickenburg, Arizona in 1987.

References

Further reading 
 
 
 
 See also this version of Northrop's  National Academy of Science biography.

External links
 
  including the Nobel Lecture on December 12, 1946 The Preparation of Pure Enzymes and Virus Proteins

1891 births
1987 suicides
20th-century American chemists
American Nobel laureates
Columbia University faculty
Columbia College (New York) alumni
Nobel laureates in Chemistry
People from Yonkers, New York
Suicides in Arizona
Rockefeller University people
People from Wickenburg, Arizona
American people of German descent
Fellows of the American Academy of Arts and Sciences
Members of the United States National Academy of Sciences
Medical physicists
Scientists from New York (state)
University of California, Berkeley faculty
1987 deaths
Havemeyer family
Columbia Graduate School of Arts and Sciences alumni